Off the Page is a young adult fiction novel co-written by American author Jodi Picoult and her daughter, Samantha Van Leer. Off the Page is Picoult's second YA novel, and also Van Leer's second published work. The novel was published on May 19, 2015 by Ember Publishing, an imprint of Random House Publishing Group and Delacorte Press. It is the second novel in the Between The Lines trilogy, following Between the Lines.

Plot summary
Delilah, a 15-year-old teenager, bookworm and social outcast, is obsessed with a fairy tale story about Prince Oliver called Between the Lines''. No one is able to understand Delilah's obsession with a book written for children. Delilah's parents are divorced, and her best friend is a punk-rocker named Jules, who is an outcast of her own choosing. Oliver and Delilah falls in and soon, Delilah discovers she can bring him out of the book.

References

Novels by Jodi Picoult
American young adult novels